Anne Seymour may refer to:
 Anne Seymour, Duchess of Somerset (1510–1587), née Stanhope, wife of the Lord Protector, Edward Seymour, 1st Duke of Somerset, and aunt of Edward VI of England
 Anne Seymour, Countess of Warwick (1538–1588), married name Anne Dudley, Countess of Warwick, poet and daughter of the above
 Anne Seymour Damer (1748–1828), sculptor
 Anne Seymour (actress) (1909–1988), American film and television character actress